Perfecta is the fifth album by alternative rock band Adam Again. This recording is the final studio album from the group, as frontman Gene Eugene died in 2000.

Track listing 
All songs written by Gene Eugene, John Knox, Greg Lawless and Paul Valadez except where noted.

"Stone" – 4:58
"Strobe" – 2:31
"All You Lucky People" (Eugene, Knox, Lawless) – 4:23
"All Right" (Eugene) – 4:33
"Harsh" – 6:10
"Air" – 3:49
"Dogjam" – 5:37
"L.C." – 5:06
"Relapse" – 6:49
"Every Mother's Way" (Eugene) – 3:57
"What's Your Name?" – 4:57
"Unfunny" (Eugene) – 3:30
"Try Not to Try" – 3:55
"Don't Cry" (Eugene) – 4:23

Personnel 
 Riki Michele – vocals 
 Gene Eugene – vocals, Rhodes piano, Moog synthesizer, guitars 
 Greg Lawless – guitars 
 Paul Valadez – bass 
 John Knox – drums 

Production
 Gene Eugene – executive producer, producer, recording 
 Ojo Taylor – executive producer
 Adam Again – producers, recording
 Anne Cardenas – art direction, design, photography

References 

1995 albums